Cop Shop is a long-running Australian police drama television series produced by Crawford Productions that ran for seven seasons between 28 November 1977 and 23 July 1984. It comprised 582 one-hour episodes.

The show
The show revolved around the everyday operations of both the uniformed police officers and the plainclothes detectives of the fictional Riverside Police Station. It also took a significant interest in the private lives of the characters.

While many Crawford Productions police dramas combined videotaped interiors with location footage shot on 16mm film, Cop Shop was shot entirely on video, including external scenes.

Two one-hour episodes were broadcast each week and featured a specific police investigation and a guest cast whose stories formed a self-contained narrative block. Alongside this the ongoing narratives of the regular characters continued in longer, more open-ended soap opera-style story threads. This same soap opera-drama series hybrid format was also used in the series  Skyways, A Country Practice and Carson's Law.

After a run of six years, the show completed taping its last episode on 22 December 1983 and the final episodes were screened in the first half of 1984.

Awards
Cop Shop won many awards including Logie Awards for most popular series and most popular actors, with Peter Adams and Paula Duncan winning multiple times. The show also won a number of other industry awards.

Cast
During its long run, many of Australia's new and established actors appeared in the show.
 

Peter Adams as Det Jeffrey "JJ" Johnson
Tony Bonner as Det Snr Const Don McKenna
Liz Burch as Liz Cameron
Terence Donovan as Det Sgt Vic Cameron
Paula Duncan as Det Const Danni Francis
Nicholas Eadie as Const Sam Phillips
Alan Fletcher as Const Frank Rossi
Billie Hammerberg as Insp Joyce Stratton
Alwyn Kurts as Sgt Reg Wallis
John Lee as Insp Ian Timms   
Joanna Lockwood as Valerie Johnson
John McTernan as Sgt Tom Shannon
George Mallaby as Det Snr Sgt Glen Taylor
Terry Norris as Sgt Eric O'Reilly
John Orcsik as Det Mike Georgiou
Louise Philip as Claire O'Reilly
Gregory Ross as Const Tony Benjamin
Bill Stalker as Det Sgt Peter Fanelli. Stalker had previously appeared as Fanelli in the Crawford series Skyways.
Lynda Stoner as Const Amanda King
Olga Tamara as Det Const Julie Mitchell 
Gil Tucker as Const Roy Baker  
Rowena Wallace as Pamela Taylor
John Walton as Terry Linford Jones
Patrick Ward as Const Peter Fleming

DVD releases

The first 26 episodes of the series are available on DVD as Volume 1 and were released on 28 April 2017. Guest stars in the first volume include Judith McGrath, Amanda Muggleton, Lois Ramsey, Debra Lawrance, Adrian Wright, Steve Bisley, Margaret Nelson, Allan Penney, Suzy Gashler, Bill Hunter, Carillo Gantner, Harold Hopkins, Christine Amor, Sue Devine, Andrew McKaige, Briony Behets, Peter Stratford, Kit Taylor, Vincent Ball, Michael Long, Noel Trevarthen, David Waters, Lisa Aldenhoven, Tommy Dysart, Maurie Fields, Tom Richards, Gary Day, Veronica Lang, Terry Gill, Shane Porteous, Moya O'Sullivan, Edward Howell, Penne Hackforth-Jones, Carole Yelland.

Volume 2 containing episodes 27-52 was released on 1 August 2017 and features Diane Craig, Kerry Armstrong, Shane Porteous, Penny Ramsey, Mercia Deane-Johns, Carillo Gantner, Celia de Burgh, Mary Ward, Lisa Aldenhoven, Shane Bourne, Jacqui Gordon, Christine Amor, Anne Charleston, Ross Skiffington, Paul Young, Peter Stratford, Colette Mann, Tom Richards, Jeanie Drynan, Queenie Ashton, Gerda Nicolson, Serge Lazareff, Anthony Hawkins, Leila Hayes, Maurie Fields, Sean Scully, Brian Wenzel, Kate Sheil, Carl Bleazby, Charles Tingwell, Cecily Polson, Tom Oliver, Ian Smith, Kirsty Child, Gerard Maguire, John Frawley, Simon Chilvers, Elspeth Ballantyne, Roger Oakley, Telford Jackson, Babs Wheelton, Bruce Kerr, Lulu Pinkus.

Volume 3 containing episodes 53-78 was released on 27 November 2017 and features Maggie Millar, Andrew McKaige, Don Barker, Carmen Duncan, Roger Oakley, Leila Hayes, Briony Behets, Belinda Davey, Susanne Haworth, Sheila Florance, John Diedrich, Patsy King, Gerard Maguire, Anthony Hawkins, Peter Aanensen, Adrian Wright, Esme Melville, Tommy Dysart, Elspeth Ballantyne, Monica Maughan, Kenneth Goodlet, George Spartels, Julia Blake, Rod Mullinar, Ronald Korosy, Bryon Williams, Henri Szeps, Peter Gwynne, Stefan Dennis, Peter Curtin, Carmel Millhouse, Carl Bleazby, Stuart Finch, Lulu Pinkus, Peter Ford, Stewart Faichney, Rosie Sturgess, Judith Dick, Kim Krejus, Joan Letch and Bruce Kerr.

Volume 4 containing episodes 79-104 was released on 29 January 2018 and features Peta Toppano, John Diedrich, Rebecca Gilling, Tom Oliver, Lynn Rainbow,  Val Jellay, Penne Hackforth-Jones, Ernie Bourne, Joanne Samuel, Steve Bisley, Sigrid Thornton, Ian Gilmour, Julia Blake, Billie Hammerberg, Liddy Clark and Betty Bobbitt.

Volume 5 containing episodes 105-130 was released on 13 April 2018 and features Mel Gibson, Judith McGrath, John Diedrich, John Walton, Ian Gilmour, Graham Rouse, Joanne Samuel, Ken Snodgrass, Monica Maughan, Peter Ford, George Spartels, Deborah Coulls, Jacqui Gordon, Jeff Ashby, Cornelia Frances, Lulu Pinkus, Terry Gill, Sandy Gore. Maggie Millar, Gerard Maguire, Christine Amor, Alan Hopgood, Roger Oakley, Denzil Howson, Bethany Lee, John Wood, Alex Porteous, Briony Behets, Kevin Summers.

Volume 6 containing episodes 131-156 was released on 16 July 2018 and features Diane Craig, Sean Scully, Maurie Fields, Shane Porteous, Shane Bourne, Irene Inescort, Adrian Wright, Olivia Hamnett, June Salter, Stefan Dennis, Richard Moir, Kim Deacon, Fay Kelton, Gary Day, Terry Gill, Kit Taylor, Belinda Giblin, Gerard Maguire, Ian Smith, Brian Hannan, Gus Mercurio, Peter Ford,  Harold Hopkins, Candy Raymond, Alan Hopgood, Jeff Ashby, Liddy Clark, Debra Lawrance, John Diedrich, Billie Hammerberg, Veronica Lang, Lulu Pinkus, Kevin Summers, Bunney Brooke, Vic Gordon, Joan Letch, Rod Mullinar.

Volume 7 containing episodes 156-182 was released on 28 September 2018 and features Judith McGrath, Diane Craig, Lulu Pinkus, Kevin Summers, Bunney Brooke, Sean Scully, Vic Gordon, Maurie Fields, Rod Mullinar, Joan Letch, Terry Gill, Denise Drysdale, Richard Moir, Terry McDermott, Peter Felmingham, Jan Friedl, Ian Gilmour, Kirsty Child, Ken Goodlet, Carl Bleazby, Debra Lawrance, Pepe Trevor, Tom Richards, Patrick Phillips, Robyn Gibbes.

Seasons
Cop Shop was originally screened in a twice weekly format on Monday and Thursdays at 20.30 in Sydney and Melbourne. At various stages of the series each city was either a week ahead or behind the other or at the same stage.
Later the series changed nights in Sydney to Wednesdays and Thursdays and then Thursdays and Fridays. It was eventually screened as a two hour weekly block in both cities on Mondays in Melbourne and Thursdays (later Saturdays) in Sydney. 
The final 36 episodes screened in a late night 23.30 slot in Sydney on weeknights from Monday 26 November 1984.

Producers and directors
Hector Crawford - Executive Producer 
Ian Crawford - Executive Producer
Ian Crawford - Producer 
Terry Stapleton - Producer 
Marie Trevor - Producer
Philip East - Director
Charles "Bud" Tingwell - Director

References

External links
Crawford Productions
 Aussie Soap Archive: Cop Shop
 
Cop Shop at the National Film and Sound Archive
Cop Shop - Ep 485 at Australian Screen Online

Australian television soap operas
1970s Australian drama television series
1970s Australian crime television series
Seven Network original programming
1977 Australian television series debuts
1984 Australian television series endings
Television shows set in Melbourne
Television series by Crawford Productions
1980s Australian drama television series
1980s Australian crime television series